Anne Madeleine Guédon de Presles, known as Mlle Guédon de Presles (early 18th century – c. 1754) was a French singer, composer and actress.

She was probably the daughter of Honoré Claude Guédon de Presles who often performed at court.

Mlle Guédon de Presles performed for the first time in court before the queen in 1748, when she sang in Mouret's ballet Les Sens. During the 1740s and 1750s, she sang at the Paris Thèâtre de la Reine in secondary roles.

Between 1742 and 1747, a number of her songs were published in Mercure de France. She is the first known woman to have published a collection of airs.

References

Year of birth unknown
1750s deaths
18th-century classical composers
French Baroque composers
French women classical composers
18th-century French composers
18th-century French actresses
French stage actresses
18th-century French singers
18th-century women composers
17th-century women composers